St. Patrick's, an independent co-educational Catholic elementary school of approximately 315 Grade K-7 students in Greater Victoria, British Columbia, Canada.

History
The school was established in 1956 by Father M. J. McNamara. In January of that year St. Patrick's School opened on Haultain Street with 4 classrooms and 50 pupils. In the late spring of 1956 the school moved to its present location. Sister Mary Edmunda was the first principal, and she remained at the school until 1961. In that same year a new gymnasium was added to the facilities.

In 1962 the school accepted students up to Grade 9 - the enrolment being approximately 450 students. In 1965 Sister Norah Keane was appointed principal and held the position for 14 years. Partial aid was granted to the school in 1977, and the school came under the auspices of the Ministry of Education.

Independent school status
St. Patrick's Elementary School is classified as a Group 1 school under British Columbia's Independent School Act. It receives 50% funding from the Ministry of Education. The school receives no funding for capital costs. It is under charge of the Catholic Independent Schools of the Roman Catholic Diocese of Victoria.

Academic departments

Mathematics
Performing Arts
Social Studies
Catholic theology
English
Humanities
Information technologies
Languages
Science
Physical Education
Visual Arts

Athletic performance

School teams

Soccer
Volleyball
Track & Field
Basketball
Cross Country
T.H.A.S.T. (Thursday afternoon sports training every week in the spring with a variety of sports to choose from ranging from Rock Climbing to Sailing)
Badminton
Mountain Biking
Swimming

Artistic performance

Performing arts

Drama
Concert Choir
Concert Band

Visual arts

Art
Photography

References

External links
 St. Patrick's Elementary School

Catholic elementary schools in British Columbia
Private schools in British Columbia
Educational institutions established in 1956
1956 establishments in British Columbia
Elementary schools in Victoria, British Columbia